Rodvik Humble (June 1, 1964) is the former Chief Executive Officer of Second Life creator Linden Lab, Chief Creative Officer at ToyTalk and former Executive Vice President for the EA Play label of the video game company Electronic Arts. He is the general manager for the Berkeley studio of Paradox Interactive. He has been contributing to the development of games since 1990, and is recently best known for his work on the Electronic Arts titles, The Sims 2 and The Sims 3. Previously he worked at Sony Online where he worked on EverQuest and before that Virgin Interactive's SubSpace.

Biography

Humble was born on June 1, 1964, in Loughborough, United Kingdom. Son of an English mother and an Irish father, Humble moved to the US when he was around 27 years old.

In his spare time, he continues to develop experimental games including The Marriage, Stars Over Half Moon Bay and Last Thoughts of the Aurochs. His work was shown and played at the SFMOMA in 2016.

On 7 October 2008, a press release noted that Electronic Arts had promoted Humble to Executive Vice President and Head of The Sims Label of EA. In this role, Humble was to be responsible for The Sims Label, the developer and marketer of life-simulation games and online communities with an emphasis on creativity, community and humor.

A non-player character in The Sims 2 expansion pack, FreeTime, is based on Humble. He is seen delivering a gift to new home-owners, the gift always being a computer, the computer having a sneak preview of The Sims 3.

On 23 December 2010, Linden Lab, the creators and operators of the virtual world Second Life, announced that he would become their new CEO as of January 2011. On 24 January 2014, Humble announced on his Facebook account that he would be leaving Linden Lab to pursue founding a new company that will "make art, entertainment and unusual things!". On 29 January 2015, Humble announced his latest solo project Cults & Daggers, with his new company Chaphat.

Paradox Interactive announced that Humble would lead its new internal studio, Paradox Tectonic, located in Berkeley, California, starting in March 2019.

On March 6, 2023, Paradox Interactive teases Life by You with Rod leading the studio.

References

External links

Rod Humble presentation at Inventing the Future of Games Symposium in 2011 Free Will and the Future of Games, 15 April 2011

Living people
Video game designers
1964 births